Drexel University is a private research university with its main campus in Philadelphia, Pennsylvania. Drexel's undergraduate school was founded in 1891 by Anthony J. Drexel, a financier and philanthropist. Founded as Drexel Institute of Art, Science and Industry, it was renamed Drexel Institute of Technology in 1936, before assuming its current name in 1970.
 
, more than 24,000 students were enrolled in over 70 undergraduate programs and more than 100 master's, doctoral, and professional programs at the university. Drexel's cooperative education program (co-op) is a prominent aspect of the school's degree programs, offering students the opportunity to gain up to 18 months of paid, full-time work experience in a field relevant to their undergraduate major or graduate degree program prior to graduation.

History

Drexel University was founded in 1891 as the Drexel Institute of Art, Science and Industry, by Philadelphia financier and philanthropist Anthony J. Drexel. The original mission of the institution was to provide educational opportunities in the "practical arts and sciences" for women and men of all backgrounds. The institution became known as the Drexel Institute of Technology in 1936, and in 1970 the Drexel Institute of Technology gained university status, becoming Drexel University.

Although there were many changes during its first century, the university's identity has been held constant as a privately controlled, non-sectarian, coeducational center of higher learning, distinguished by a commitment to practical education and hands-on experience in an occupational setting. The central aspect of Drexel University's focus on career preparation, in the form of its cooperative education program, was introduced in 1919. The program became integral to the university's unique educational experience. Participating students alternate periods of classroom-based study with periods of full-time, practical work experience related to their academic major and career interests.

Between 1995 and 2009, Drexel University underwent a period of significant change to its programs, enrollment, and facilities under the leadership of Dr. Constantine Papadakis, the university's president during that time. Papadakis oversaw Drexel's largest expansion in its history, with a 471 percent increase in its endowment and a 102 percent increase in student enrollment. His leadership also guided the university toward improved performance in collegiate rankings, a more selective approach to admissions, and a more rigorous academic program at all levels. It was during this period of expansion that Drexel acquired and assumed management of the former MCP Hahnemann University, creating the Drexel University College of Medicine in 2002. In 2006, the university established the Thomas R. Kline School of Law, and in 2011 the School of Law achieved full accreditation by the American Bar Association.

Dr. Constantine Papadakis died of pneumonia in April 2009 while still employed as the university's president. His successor, John Anderson Fry, was formerly the president of Franklin & Marshall College and served as the Executive Vice President of the University of Pennsylvania. Under Fry's leadership, Drexel has continued its expansion, including the July 2011 acquisition of The Academy of Natural Sciences.

Academics

Schools and colleges

College of Arts and Sciences

The College of Arts and Sciences was formed in 1990 when Drexel merged the two existing College of Sciences and College of Humanities together.

Antoinette Westphal College of Media Arts and Design

The College of Media Arts and Design "fosters the study, exploration and management of the arts: media, design, the performing and visual". The college offers sixteen undergraduate programs, and 6 graduate programs, in modern art and design fields that range from graphic design and dance to fashion design and television management. Its wide range of programs has helped the college earn full accreditation from the National Association of Schools of Art and Design, the National Architectural Accrediting Board, and the Council for Interior Design Accreditation.

Bennett S. LeBow College of Business

The Bennett S. LeBow College of Business history dates to the founding in 1891 of the Drexel Institute, that later became Drexel University, and of its Business Department in 1896. Today LeBow offers thirteen undergraduate majors, eight graduate programs, and two doctoral programs; 22 percent of Drexel University's undergraduate students are enrolled in a LeBow College of Business program. 

The LeBow College of Business has been ranked as the 38th best private business school in the nation. Its online MBA program is ranked 14th in the world by the Financial Times; the publication also ranks the undergraduate business program at LeBow as 19th in the United States. The part-time MBA program ranks 1st in academic quality in the 2015 edition of Business Insider's rankings. Undergraduate and graduate entrepreneurship programs are ranked 19th in the country by the Princeton Review. Lebow College of Business's Master of Finance program is ranked 101st in the world by the 2020 QS World University Rankings.

School of Economics
Economics programs at the LeBow College of Business are housed within the School of Economics. In addition to the undergraduate program in economics, the school is home to an M.S. in Economics program as well as a PhD program in economics. Faculty members in the School of Economics have been published in the American Economic Review, RAND Journal of Economics, and Review of Economics and Statistics. The school has been ranked among the best in the world for its extensive research into matters of international trade.

College of Engineering

Drexel's College of Engineering is one of its oldest and largest academic colleges, and served as the original focus of the career-oriented school upon its founding in 1891. The College of Engineering is home to several notable alumni, including two astronauts; financier Bennett S. LeBow, for whom the university's College of Business is named; and Paul Baran, inventor of the packet-switched network. Today, Drexel University's College of Engineering, which is home to 19 percent of the undergraduate student body, is known for creating the world's first engineering degree in appropriate technology. The college is also one of only 17 U.S. universities to offer a bachelor's degree in architectural engineering, and only one of five private institutions to do so.

The Drexel Engineering Curriculum (tDEC)
The 2006 edition of U.S. News ranks the undergraduate engineering program #57 in the country and the 2007 edition of graduate schools ranks the graduate program #61. The 2008 edition ranks the University Engineering Program at #55 and in the 2009 US News Ranking, the university has moved up to the #52 position.

The engineering curriculum used by the school was originally called E4 (Enhanced Educational Experience for Engineers) which was established in 1986 and funded in part by the Engineering Directorate of the National Science Foundation. In 1988 the program evolved into tDEC (the Drexel Engineering Curriculum) which is composed of two full years of rigorous core engineering courses which encompass the freshman and sophomore years of the engineering student. The College of Engineering hasn't used the tDEC curriculum since approximately 2005.

College of Computing and Informatics

The College of Computing and Informatics is a recent addition to Drexel University, though its programs have been offered to students for many years. The college was formed by the consolidation of the former College of Information Science & Technology (often called the "iSchool"), the Department of Computer Science, and the Computing and Security Technology program. Undergraduate and graduate programs in computer science, software engineering, data science, information systems, and computer security are offered by the college.

College of Medicine

The Drexel University College of Medicine was added to the colleges and schools of the university in 2002, having been formed upon the acquisition of MCP Hahnemann University. In addition to its M.D. program, the College of Medicine offers more than 40 graduate programs in its Graduate School of Biomedical Sciences and Professional Studies.

Graduate School of Biomedical Sciences and Professional Studies
The Graduate School of Biomedical Sciences and Professional studies offers both Master of Science and Doctor of Philosophy degree programs in fields like biochemistry, biotechnology, clinical research, and forensic science. The school also serves as the center for biomedical research at Drexel University.

School of Biomedical Engineering, Science and Health Systems
Founded in 1961 as the United States' first Biomedical Engineering and Science Institute, the School of Biomedical Engineering, Science and Health Systems focuses on the emerging field of biomedical science at the undergraduate, graduate, and doctoral levels. Primary research areas within the school include bioinformatics, biomechanics, biomaterials, neuroengineering, and cardiovascular engineering.

College of Nursing and Health Professions

Formed in 2002 along with the College of Medicine, Drexel's College of Nursing and Health Professions offers more than 25 programs to undergraduate and graduate students in the fields of nursing, nutrition, health sciences, health services, and radiologic technology. The college's research into matters of nutrition and rehabilitation have garnered approximately $2.9 million in external research funding on an annual basis. The physician assistant program at Drexel's College of Nursing and Health Professions is ranked in the top 15 such programs in the United States; its anesthesia programs and physical therapy programs are, respectively, ranked as top-50 programs nationwide.

Richard C. Goodwin College of Professional Studies

Established in 1892, the department now known as the College of Professional Studies has focused exclusively on educational programs and pursuits for nontraditional adult learners. Today, the Goodwin College of Professional Studies offers several options designed for adult learners at all stages of career and educational development. Bachelor of Science degree completion programs are offered in part-time evening or weekend formats; graduate programs and doctoral programs are offered at the graduate level, as are self-paced "continuing education" courses and nearly a dozen self-paced certification programs.

Pennoni Honors College

The Pennoni Honors College, named for Drexel alumnus and trustee Dr. C.R. "Chuck" Pennoni '63, '66, Hon. '92, and his wife Annette, recognizes and promotes excellence among Drexel students. Students admitted to the Honors College live together and take many of the same classes; the college provides these students with access to unique cultural and social activities and a unique guest speaker series. Students are also involved in the university's Honors Student Advisory Committee and have the opportunity to take part in Drexel's "Alternative Spring Break", an international study tour held each spring.

Thomas R. Kline School of Law

Upon its founding in 2006, the Thomas R. Kline School of Law, originally known as the Earle Mack School of Law, was the first law school founded in Philadelphia in more than three decades. The School of Law offers L.L.M. and Master of Legal Studies degrees, in addition to the flagship Juris Doctor program, and uniquely offers cooperative education as part of its curriculum across all programs. In 2015, Bloomberg Business ranked the Kline School of Law as the second most underrated law school in the United States.

School of Education
One of the oldest schools within Drexel University, the modern School of Education dates back to the 1891 founding of the school. Originally, the Department of Education offered teacher training to women as one of its original, career-focused degree programs. Today, the School of Education offers a coeducational approach to teacher training at the elementary and secondary levels for undergraduates. Other undergraduate programs include those focused on the intersection between learning and technology, teacher certification for non-education majors, and a minor in education for students with an interest in instruction. Graduate degrees offered by the School of Education include those in administration and leadership, special education, higher education, mathematics education, international education, and educational creativity and innovation. Doctoral degrees are offered in educational leadership and learning technologies.

Dornsife School of Public Health

The School of Public Health states that its mission is to "provide education, conduct research, and partner with communities and organizations to improve the health of populations". To that end, the school offers both a B.S. and a minor in public health for undergraduate students as well as several options for students pursuing graduate and doctoral degrees in the field. At the graduate level, the Dornsife School offers both a Master of Public Health and an Executive Master of Public Health, as well as an M.S. in biostatistics and an M.S. in epidemiology. Two Doctor of Public Health degrees are also offered, as isa Doctor of Philosophy in epidemiology. The school's graduate and doctoral students are heavily invested in the research activities of the Dornsife School of Public Health, which has helped the school attract annual funding for its four research centers.

Center for Hospitality and Sport Management
The Center for Hospitality and Sport Management was formed in 2013, in an effort to house and consolidate academic programs in hospitality, tourism management, the culinary arts, and sport management. Academic programs combine the unique skills required of the sports and hospitality industries with the principles and curriculum espoused by the management programs within Drexel's LeBow College of Business.

Charles D. Close School of Entrepreneurship
Focusing specifically on the skills required to successfully start and launch a business, the Charles D. Close School of Entrepreneurship is the first and only freestanding school of entrepreneurship in the United States. Undergraduate students take part in a B.A. program in entrepreneurship and innovation, while graduate students a combined Master of Science degree in biomedicine and entrepreneurship. Minors in entrepreneurship are also offered to undergraduate students.

Laurence A. Baiada Institute for Entrepreneurship
Housed within the Close School is the Baiada Institute for Entrepreneurship. The institute serves as an incubator for Drexel student startups, providing resources and mentorships to students and some post-graduates who are starting their own business while enrolled in one of the Close School's degree programs or academic minors.

Online education
Drexel University launched its first Internet-based education program, a master's degree in Library & Information Science, in 1996. In 2001, Drexel created its wholly owned, for-profit online education subsidiary, Drexel e-Learning, Inc., better known as Drexel University Online. It was announced in October 2013 that Drexel University Online would no longer be a for-profit venture, but rather become an internal division within the university to better serve its online student population. Although headquartered in Philadelphia, Drexel announced a new Washington, D.C., location in December 2012 to serve as both an academic and outreach center, catering to the online student population.

In an effort to create greater awareness of distance learning and to recognize exceptional leaders and best practices in the field, Drexel University Online founded National Distance Learning Week, in conjunction with the United States Distance Learning Association, in 2007. In September 2010, Drexel University Online received the Sloan-C award for institution-wide excellence in online education indicating that it had exceptional programs of "demonstrably high quality" at the regional and national levels and across disciplines. Drexel University Online won the 2008 United States Distance Learning Association's Best Practices Awards for Distance Learning Programming. In 2007, the online education subsidiary had a revenue of $40 million. In March 2013, Drexel Online had more than 7,000 unique students from all 50 states and more than 20 countries pursuing a bachelor's, master's, or certificate. , Drexel University Online offers more than 100 fully accredited master's degrees, bachelor's degrees and certificate programs.

Cooperative education program
Drexel's longstanding cooperative education, or "co-op" program is one of the largest and oldest in the United States. Drexel has a fully internet-based job database, where students can submit résumés and request interviews with any of the thousands of companies that offer positions. Students also have the option of obtaining a co-op via independent search. A student graduating from Drexel's 5-year degree program typically has a total of 18 months of co-op with up to three different companies. The majority of co-ops are paid, averaging $18,720 per 6-month period, however this figure changes with major. About one third of Drexel graduates are offered full-time positions by their co-op employers right after graduation.

Research activity
Drexel is classified among "R1: Doctoral Universities – Very High Research Activity". The university was ranked 51st in the 2018 edition of the "Top 100 Worldwide Universities Granted U.S. Utility Patents" list released by the National Academy of Inventors and the Intellectual Property Owners Association.

Research Centers and Institutes at Drexel include:

 Arts and Sciences
 Center for Interdisciplinary Programs
 Center for Public Policy
 Mobilities and Research Policy
 Education
 The Center for Labor Markets and Policy
 The Center for the Prevention of School-Aged Violence
 The Math Forum
 Information Science
 Data Mining & Bioinformatics Lab
 Geographic Information Systems & Spatial Analysis Lab
 Institute for Healthcare Informatics
 Metadata Research Center
 Media Arts & Design
 Kal and Lucille Rudman Institute for Entertainment Industry Studies
 The RePlay Lab
 Business and Leadership
 Laurence A. Baiada Institute for Entrepreneurship
 Center for Corporate Governance
 Sovereign Institute for Strategic Leadership
 Center for Corporate Reputation Management
 Engineering
 A.J. Drexel Plasma Institute
 A.J. Drexel Applied Communications and Information Networking (ACIN) Institute
 A. J. Drexel Institute of Basic and Applied Protein Science
 A. J. Drexel Nanotechnology Institute (DNI)
 Ben Franklin Technology Partners' Nanotechnology Institute
 Center for Electric Power Engineering
 Center for Telecommunications and Information Networking
 Centralized Research Facilities (CRF)
 Public Health
 Autism Public Health Research Institute
 Center for Health Equality (CHE)
 Center for Public Health Readiness and Communication (CPHRC)
 Center for Nonviolence and Social Justice
 National Resource Center on Advancing Emergency Preparedness
 Center for Public Health Practice

Rankings

In its 2022 rankings, U.S. News & World Report ranked Drexel tied for 103rd among national universities in the United States, tied for 57th in the "Most Innovative Schools" category, 100th in "Best Value Schools", and tied for 249th in "Top Performers on Social Mobility.

In its 2018 rankings, Times Higher Education World University Rankings and The Wall Street Journal ranked Drexel 74th among national universities and 351st-400th among international universities.

In its 2018 rankings, Forbes ranked Drexel 24th among STEM universities. In 2019, it also ranked Drexel 226th among 650 national universities, liberal arts colleges and service academies, 120th among research universities, 154th among private universities, and 96th among universities in the Northeast.

In 2016, Bloomberg Businessweek ranked the undergraduate business program 78th in the country.  In 2014, Business Insider ranked Drexel's graduate business school 19th in the country for networking.

Campuses

Drexel University's programs are divided across three Philadelphia-area campuses: the University City Campus, the Center City  Campus and the Queen Lane College of Medicine Campus.

University City Main Campus
The  University City Main Campus of Drexel University is located just west of the Schuylkill River in the University City district of Philadelphia. It is Drexel's largest and oldest campus; the campus contains the university's administrative offices and serves as the main academic center for students. The northern, residential portion of the main campus is located in the Powelton Village section of West Philadelphia. The two prominent performing stages at Drexel University are the Mandell Theater and the Main Auditorium. The Main Auditorium dates back to the founding of Drexel and construction of its main hall. It features over 1000 seats, and a pipe organ installed in 1928. The organ was purchased by Saturday Evening Post publisher Cyrus H. K. Curtis after he had donated a similar organ, the Curtis Organ, to nearby University of Pennsylvania and it was suggested that he do the same for Drexel. The 424-seat Mandell Theater was built in 1973 and features a more performance-oriented stage, including a full fly system, modern stage lighting facilities, stadium seating, and accommodations for wheelchairs. It is used for the semiannual spring musical, as well as various plays and many events.

Queen Lane Campus
The Queen Lane Campus was purchased by Drexel University as part of its acquisition of MCP Hahnemann University. It is located in the East Falls neighborhood of northwest Philadelphia and is primarily utilized by first- and second-year medical students, and researchers. A free shuttle is available, connecting the Queen Lane Campus to the Center City Hahnemann and University City Main campuses.

Center City Campus 

The Center City Campus is in the middle of Philadelphia, straddling the Vine Street Expressway between Broad and 15th Streets. Shuttle service is offered between the Center City Campus and both the University City and Queen Lane campuses of the university.

The Academy of Natural Sciences

In 2011, The Academy of Natural Sciences entered into an agreement to become a subsidiary of Drexel University. Founded in 1812, the Academy of Natural Sciences is America's oldest natural history museum and is a world leader in biodiversity and environmental research.

Drexel University Sacramento

On January 5, 2009, Drexel University opened the Center for Graduate Studies in Sacramento, California. Eventually renamed Drexel University Sacramento upon the addition of an undergraduate program in business administration, the campus also offered an Ed.D. program in Educational Leadership and Management and master's degree programs in Business Administration, Finance, Higher Education, Human Resource Development, Public Health, and Interdepartmental Medical Science. On March 5, 2015, Drexel University announced the closure of the Sacramento campus, with an 18-month "phase out" period designed to allow current students to complete their degrees.

Student life

Student government
The Undergraduate Student Government Association of Drexel University works with administrators to solve student problems and tries to promote communication between the students and the administration.

Graduate Students Association
The Graduate Student Association "advocates the interests and addresses concerns of graduate students at Drexel; strives to enhance graduate student life at the University in all aspects, from academic to campus security; and provides a formal means of communication between graduate students and the University community".

Campus Activities Board
The Campus Activities Board (CAB) is an undergraduate, student-run event planning organization. CAB creates events for the undergraduate population. To assist with planning and organization, the Campus Activities Board is broken down into 5 committees: Special Events, Traditions, Marketing, Culture and Discovery, and Performing and Fine Arts.

Jewish life on campus
Drexel has an approximate Jewish population of 5% and has both a Chabad House and a Hillel. Both provide services to Jewish and non-Jewish students at Drexel. Due to the recent influx of Orthodox Jewish students the Chabad now has its own daily kosher meal plan. The Hillel also has hot kosher food but only on select nights. There is also an eruv which is jointly managed by Jewish students from Drexel and the University of Pennsylvania.

Press and radio

Radio

WKDU is Drexel's student-run FM radio station, with membership open to all undergraduate students. Its status as an 800-watt, non-commercial station in a major market city has given it a wider audience and a higher profile than many other college radio stations.

Television
DUTV is Drexel's Philadelphia cable television station. The student operated station is part of the Paul F. Harron Studios at Drexel University. The purpose of DUTV is to provide "the people of Philadelphia with quality educational television, and providing Drexel students the opportunity to gain experience in television management and production". The Programing includes an eclectic variety of shows from a bi-monthly news show, DNews, to old films, talk shows dealing with important current issues and music appreciation shows. Over 75 percent of DUTV's programming is student produced.

Publications
The Triangle has been the university's newspaper since 1926 and currently publishes on a weekly basis every Friday. 
The Triangle has won several Mark of Excellence Awards which honor the best in Student Journalism from the Society of Professional Journalists. First place in  Editorial Writing (2000), General Column Writing (2000), Second place in Editorial Writing (2001), and third place in Sports Column Writing (2001). In 2004, it won two National Pacemaker Awards for excellence in college newspapers. In December 2019 The Triangle announced the creation of their podcasting division, "Tri-Pod,", which debuted on January 10, 2020. Tri-Pod currently has two active podcasts, "Last Call". and "Mark and Jair Explain Sports".

The school yearbook was first published in 1911 and named the Lexerd in 1913. Prior to the publishing of a campus wide yearbook in 1911 The Hanseatic and The Eccentric were both published in 1896 as class books. Other publications include MAYA, the undergraduate student literary and artistic magazine; D&M Magazine, Design & Merchandising students crafted magazine; The Smart Set from Drexel University, an online magazine founded in 2005; and The Drexelist a blog-style news source founded in 2010.

The Drexel Publishing Group serves as a medium for literary publishing on campus. The Drexel Publishing Group oversees ASK (The Journal of the College of Arts and Sciences at Drexel University), Painted Bride Quarterly, a 36-year-old national literary magazine housed at Drexel; The 33rd, an annual anthology of student and faculty writing at Drexel; DPG Online Magazine, and Maya, the undergraduate literary and artistic magazine. The Drexel Publishing Group also serves as a pedagogical organization by allowing students to intern and work on its publications.

Housing

Drexel requires all non-commuting first- and second-year students to live in one of its ten residence halls or in "university approved housing". First year students must live in one of the residence halls designated specifically for first-years. These residence halls include Millennium, Bentley, Kelly, Myers, Towers, Van Rensselaer, North, and Race Halls. Kelly, Myers, Towers, and Bentley Halls are traditional residence halls (a bedroom shared with one or more roommate(s) and one bathroom per floor), while Race, North, Caneris, and Van Rensselaer Halls are suite-style residence halls (shared bedrooms, private bathrooms, kitchens, and common area within the suite). Millennium Hall, Drexel's newest residence hall, is a modified suite (a bedroom shared with one roommate, and bathrooms and showers that look like closets with open sinks in the hallway).

Each residence hall is designed to facilitate the Freshman Experience in a slightly different way. Millennium, Kelly, and Towers Halls are all typical residence halls. Myers Hall offers "Living Learning Communities" where a group of students who share common interests such as language or major live together. Most of Bentley Hall is reserved for students of the Pennoni Honors College, although some floors are occupied by other students.

Second-year students have the option of living in a residence hall designated for upperclassmen, or "university approved housing". The residence halls for upperclassmen are North and Caneris Halls. North Hall operates under the For Students By Students Residential Experience Engagement Model, developed by the Residential Living Office. There are many apartments that are university approved that second-year students can choose to live in. Three of the largest apartment buildings that fit this description are Chestnut Square, University Crossings, and The Summit, all owned by American Campus Communities. Many other students live in smaller apartment buildings or individual townhouse-style apartments in Powelton Village. A second-year student can choose one of the already listed university approved housing options or petition the university to add a new property to the approved list. While living in a university approved apartment offers the freedom of living outside a residence hall, due to the Drexel co-op system, many students end up in the residence halls because they operate on a quarter to quarter basis, and don't require students to be locked into leases.

Graduate students can live in Stiles Hall.

All residence halls except Caneris Hall and Stiles Memorial Hall are located north of Arch Street between 34th Street and 32nd Street in the Powelton Village area.

Student organizations
Drexel University recognizes over 250 student organizations in the following categories:
 Academic
 Club Sports
 Community Service/Social Action
 Cultural
 Fraternity & Sorority Life
 General Interest
 Honorary
 Media
 Performing and Fine Arts
 Political
 Spiritual & Religious

Honorary and professional organizations
The following groups are recognized as honors or professional organizations under the Office of Campus Activities and are not considered part of social Greek life at Drexel University.
 Alpha Kappa Psi - Eta Psi chapter (est. 2008) - Professional Business Fraternity
 Alpha Omega Epsilon - Social and Professional Sorority for Engineers
 Alpha Phi Omega, Zeta Theta chapter (est. 1948) - National Service Fraternity
 Alpha Phi Sigma - National Criminal Justice Honor Society
 Beta Alpha Psi, Delta Tau chapter - Honors Fraternity for Accounting, Finance and MIS
 Beta Beta Beta - National Biological Honor Society
 Beta Gamma Sigma, - International Business Honor Society
 Chi Epsilon - National Civil Engineering Honors Society
 Delta Epsilon Iota, Upsilon Delta chapter - (Dragons for Excellence and Inspiration) National Honors Society
 Delta Sigma Pi, Omega Chi Chapter - Co-Ed Professional Fraternity Eta Kappa Nu, Beta Alpha chapter (est. 1935) - Electrical Engineering Honor Society Gamma Sigma Sigma - National Service Sorority Kappa Delta Pi - International Honor Society in Education
 Phi Chi Theta - Zeta Delta (est. 2008) - Professional Business Fraternity Phi Delta Epsilon - National Co-Ed Premedical Fraternity Phi Eta Sigma - National Honors Society Phi Sigma Pi, Gamma Xi chapter - Honors Fraternity Pi Nu Epsilon - Music and Performing Arts Fraternity Pi Sigma Alpha, Alpha Epsilon Chi chapter - The National Political Science Honor Society Pi Tau Sigma, Xi chapter - International Mechanical Engineering Fraternity Psi Chi - International Honors Society - Psychology Fraternity Tau Beta Pi, Pennsylvania Zeta chapter - Engineering Honor Society Upsilon Pi Epsilon - Computer Science FraternityGreek life
Approximately 12 percent of Drexel's undergraduate population are members of a social Greek-letter organization. There are currently fourteen Interfraternity Council (IFC) chapters, seven Panhellenic Council (PHC) chapters and thirteen Multi-cultural Greek Council (MGC) chapters.

Two IFC chapters have been awarded Top Chapters in 2008 by their respective national organizations; Pi Kappa Alpha, and Alpha Chi Rho. In 2013, Sigma Phi Epsilon and Alpha Epsilon Pi were awarded the Top Chapter award by their respective national headquarters.

IFC fraternities
 Alpha Chi Rho, Lambda Chi Phi chapter (est. 1992)
 Alpha Epsilon Pi, Delta Rho chapter (est. 1995)
 Alpha Pi Lambda, local fraternity (est. 1935)
 Beta Chi Theta, Alpha Beta colony (est. 2014)
 Beta Theta Pi, Eta Omicron chapter (est. 2016)
 Delta Sigma Phi, Gamma Chi chapter (est. 1956, Recolonized 2011)
 Lambda Chi Alpha, Epsilon Kappa Zeta chapter, (est. 1941, Recolonized Fall 2009)
 Phi Kappa Psi, PA Upsilon chapter (est. 2002)
 Pi Kappa Alpha, Lambda Zeta chapter (est. 2001)
 Pi Kappa Phi, Alpha Upsilon chapter (est. 1919, Recolonized 2007)
 Pi Lambda Phi, PA Delta Iota chapter (est. 1965, Recolonized 2017)
 Sigma Alpha Mu, Mu Eta chapter, (est. 1947, Recolonized 2009)
 Sigma Phi Epsilon, Pennsylvania Beta Beta chapter (est. 1999)
 Theta Chi, Beta Theta chapter (est. 1927)

MGC organizations
 Alpha Kappa Alpha sorority, Gamma Epsilon chapter (est. 1945)
 Alpha Phi Alpha fraternity, Psi chapter (Recolonized at Drexel in fall 2011)
 Delta Epsilon Psi fraternity, Xi chapter (est. 2010) 
 Delta Phi Omega sorority, Gamma chapter (est. 2000)
 Delta Sigma Theta sorority, (Recolonized 2008)
 Iota Nu Delta fraternity, Gamma chapter (est. 1997)
 Lambda Upsilon Lambda, Delta Chapter (est. 1988)
 Kappa Alpha Psi fraternity,
 Kappa Phi Gamma, Nu colony (est. 2011)
 Omega Psi Phi
 Pi Alpha Phi, Fraternity, Phi chapter (est. 2014)
 Sigma Beta Rho fraternity, Upsilon chapter, (est. 2002)
 Sigma Psi Zeta sorority, Nu chapter (est. 2002)
 Kappa Phi Lambda sorority, Drexel Associate Chapter (est. 2019)

Sororities
 Alpha Sigma Alpha, Nu Nu chapter (est. 1925)
 Delta Gamma, Eta Upsilon chapter (est. 2016)
 Delta Phi Epsilon, Delta Epsilon chapter (est. 1942, recolonized 2003)
 Delta Zeta, Epsilon Zeta chapter (est. 1928)
 Phi Mu, Beta Tau chapter (est. 1954)
 Phi Sigma Sigma, Beta Rho chapter (est. 1959)
 Sigma Sigma Sigma, Alpha Delta chapter (est. 1926, recolonized 2011)
 Zeta Phi Beta

Athletics

Drexel's school mascot is a dragon known as "Mario the Magnificent", named in honor of alumnus and Board of Trustees member Mario V. Mascioli. The Dragon has been the mascot of the school since around the mid-1920s; the first written reference to the Dragons occurred in 1928, when the football team was called "The Dragons in The Triangle". Before becoming known as the Dragons, the athletic teams had been known by such names as the Blue & Gold, the Engineers, and the Drexelites. The school's sports teams, now known as the Drexel Dragons, participate in the NCAA's Division I as a member of the Colonial Athletic Association. They do not currently field a varsity football team.

In addition to its NCAA Division I teams, Drexel University is home to 33 active club teams including men's ice hockey, lacrosse, water polo, squash, triathlon, and cycling. Other club teams include soccer, baseball, rugby, field hockey, and roller hockey. The club teams operate under the direction of the Club Sports Council and the Recreational Sports Office.

Student lore and traditions
Tradition suggests that rubbing the toe of the bronze "Waterboy" statue, located in the Main Building atrium, can result in receiving good grades on exams. Although the rest of the bronze statue has developed a dark brown patina over the years, the toe has remained highly polished and shines like new.

In popular culture

Drexel has appeared in news and television media several times. In 2006 Drexel served as the location for ABC Family's reality show "Back on Campus". Also in 2006, the Epsilon Zeta chapter of Delta Zeta won ABC Daytime's Summer of Fun contest. As a result, the sorority was featured in national television spots for a week and hosted an ABC party on campus, which was attended by cast members from General Hospital and All My Children''.

John Langdon, who taught typography in the Antoinette Westphal College of Media Arts & Design from 1988 to 2015, created the ambigram featured on the cover of Dan Brown's Angels & Demons; a number of other ambigrams served as the central focus of the book and its corresponding film. Dan Brown used the name Robert Langdon for the lead character, played by Tom Hanks, in his novels as a tribute to John Langdon.

In 2007, Drexel was the host of the 2008 Democratic presidential candidate debate in Philadelphia, televised by MSNBC. The university hosted the US Table Tennis Olympic Trials between January 10 and 13, 2008. Drexel University also hosted the 2011 U.S. Open Squash Championships from October 1–6, 2011, as well as the 2012 U.S. Open Squash Championships from October 4–12, 2012.

Alumni

Since its founding the university has graduated over 100,000 alumni. Certificate-earning alumni such as artist Violet Oakley and illustrator Frank Schoonover reflect the early emphasis on art as part of the university's curriculum. With World War II, the university's technical programs swelled, and as a result Drexel graduated alumni such as Paul Baran, one of the founding fathers of the Internet and one of the inventors of the packet switching network, and Norman Joseph Woodland, the inventor of barcode technology. In addition to its emphasis on technology Drexel has graduated several notable athletes such as National Basketball Association (NBA) basketball players Michael Anderson, Damion Lee, and Malik Rose, and several notable business people such as Raj Gupta, former president and Chief executive officer (CEO) of Rohm and Haas, and Kenneth C. Dahlberg, former CEO of Science Applications International Corporation (SAIC). Alassane Dramane Ouattara President of the Republic of Ivory Coast. In 2018, Tirthak Saha -a 2016 graduate of the ECE school - was named to the Forbes 30 Under 30 list for achievements in the Energy field.

In 1991, the university's centennial anniversary, Drexel created an association called the Drexel 100, for alumni who have demonstrated excellence work, philanthropy, or public service. After the creation of the association 100 alumni were inducted in 1992 and since then the induction process has been on a biennial basis. In 2006 164 total alumni had been inducted into the association.

Awards
Drexel University created the annual $100,000 Anthony J. Drexel Exceptional Achievement Award to recognize a faculty member from a U.S. institution whose work transforms both research and the society it serves. The first recipient was bioengineer James J. Collins of Boston University (now at MIT) and the Howard Hughes Medical Institute.

In 2004, in conjunction with BAYADA Home Health Care, Drexel University's College of Nursing and Health Professions created the BAYADA Award for Technological Innovation in Nursing Education and Practice. The award honors nursing educators and practicing nurses whose innovation leads to improved patient care or improved nursing education.

Gallery

See also

 Association of Independent Technological Universities

Notes

External links

 
 Drexel Athletics website
 

 
Eastern Pennsylvania Rugby Union
Educational institutions established in 1891
Universities and colleges in Philadelphia
Private universities and colleges in Pennsylvania
Universities and colleges in Placer County, California
1891 establishments in Pennsylvania
University City, Philadelphia
Technological universities in the United States